A partisan (also known as a partizan) is a type of polearm that was used in Europe during the 16th, 17th, and 18th centuries. It consisted of a spearhead mounted on a long wooden shaft, with protrusions on the sides which aided in parrying sword thrusts. The partisan was often used by infantry soldiers, who would use the weapon to fend off cavalry charges. The protrusions on the sides of the spearhead were also useful for catching and trapping an opponent's sword, allowing the user to disarm them. In profile, the head of a partisan may look similar to other types of polearm, such as the halberd, pike, ranseur, spontoon, ox tongue, or spetum.

The arrival of practical firearms led to the obsolescence of the partisan and other polearms. Despite this, the weapon continued to be used for many years as a ceremonial weapon. Ceremonial partisans can still be seen in the hands of guards at important buildings or events.

Gallery

References

Blade weapons
Polearms
Renaissance-era polearms